Obolonskyi District (Obolons'kyi raion) is an urban district of the Ukrainian capital Kyiv. Obolonskyi District encompasses territories far beyond of its historical neighborhood sharing the same name. It was formed on 3 March 1975 and initially called as Minskyi District. In 2001 it was renamed to its historical name. Its current population is 290,000 inhabitants.

Overview 
During Soviet rule of Ukraine, Kyiv had 14 administrative districts. In the early 21st century, a new law was passed and the city's administrative division was reorganized into 10 districts with different borders and new names.

The Obolonskyi District encompasses the territories of the former Minskyi District and is still sometimes referred to by that name. It also includes the former town of Pushcha-Vodytsia that used to be part of the Podilskyi District. The name Obolon comes from the Old-Ukrainian word оболонь → болонь → болоньє (obolon'  → bolon'  → bolon'ye), which roughly translates as "flood plain" or an area that is being engulfed by water. The district was built up in the 1970s as a microdistrict in Kyiv on the Obolon sands to satisfy the growth of the city. Due to the composition of the soil at the time, the majority of the buildings were at most nine stories tall, and few trees were planted when compared to other parts of the city. That and few other reasons originally made the district not very prestigious.

With the second construction period (2000–2005), the district has seen new, comfortable apartment buildings constructed closer to the Dnieper river and has become an attractive residential area. The new apartments are also much more expensive, although still cheaper than in the central parts of Kyiv. The district was connected by metro in the 1980s, with a station Obolon opened on 5 November 1980.

A yachting club for both kids and adults was opened in around 1990, and recently many of the Obolon lakes were cleaned up in order to make the area more attractive. The area closer to the Dnieper river is a popular relaxation place for Kyiv residents. The area is also well known for the beer factory Obolon CJSC.

Park Natalka is among recreational spaces favored by Kyiv residents. It is located along the Dnieper river.

Major neighborhoods 
 Obolon, a residential area (masyv) and an industrial zone of the Kyiv city. It is located between Dnieper river, Stepan Bandera Avenue, Verbova Street, and Dehtyarenko Street.
 Kurenivka, an area towards the downtown of Kyiv. In the 17th century it used to be a suburb of the Kyiv city where the Kyiv Cossack Kosh was garrisoned. Its name is derived from one of the cossack's military formations, kurin (company). In the 18th century there was built the Petropavlivska Church that in the Soviet times was destroyed and rebuilt under one of the industrial buildings. Kurenivka also became famous for a massive tragedy of the Kurenivka mudslide in 1961.
 Priorka, it is believed to be settled by monks (priors) of the Dominican Order on the road to Vyshhorod. Since 1834 the settlement was incorporated into the Kyiv-city.
 Minsky masyv, a residential area (masyv) of Kyiv. It is located between Shevchenko Square, Minsk Parkway, Konradyuk Street, Maiorov Street, Panch Street, Polyarna Street. The area also contains "sub-neighborhood" Kyn-Grust.

Gallery

See also 
 Subdivisions of Kyiv

References

External links 

 Brief history of the Obolonskyi and Minskyi Districts
  obolonrda.gov.ua – Obolonskyi District administration website
  Unofficial Kyiv Metro site – Information about the Obolon metro station
  Оболонь in Web Encyclopedia Kyiv

 
Urban districts of Kyiv